The 1906 Leicester by-election was held on 30 March 1906.  The by-election was held due to the resignation of the incumbent Liberal MP, Henry Broadhurst.  It was won by the Liberal candidate Franklin Thomasson.

References

Leicester by-election
Elections in Leicester
Leicester by-election
Leicester by-election
By-elections to the Parliament of the United Kingdom in Leicestershire constituencies
20th century in Leicestershire
20th century in Leicester